Michael Zechner (born 31 January 1975) is a retired Austrian footballer. Zechner played for FK Austria Wien, First Vienna FC, Wiener Sport-Club, SKN St. Pölten, Union Berlin, SC Paderborn 07, SC-ESV Parndorf 1919, Sturm Graz and Kapfenberger SV.

Career

Coaching career
On 22 April 2010, while playing for ASK Kottingbrunn, Zechner was appointed manager of the club until the end of the season. He left the club at the end of the season.

In the beginning of May 2014, Zechner was appointed interim manager, alongside Siegfried Seltenhammer, for FC Mistelbach: the club he was playing for at the moment.

References

External links
 
 Michael Zechner player profile at ÖFB
 Michael Zechner manager profile at ÖFB

1975 births
Living people
Austrian footballers
Austrian expatriate footballers
FK Austria Wien players
FC Admira Wacker Mödling players
First Vienna FC players
Favoritner AC players
Wiener Sport-Club players
SKN St. Pölten players
1. FC Union Berlin players
SC Paderborn 07 players
SK Sturm Graz players
Kapfenberger SV players
SC-ESV Parndorf 1919 players
Association football forwards
Austrian football managers
Austrian expatriate sportspeople in Germany
Expatriate footballers in Germany